or Money Diamond, is a Japanese baseball manga series written by Yūji Moritaka and illustrated by Keiji Adachi. The manga was serialized in Kodansha's seinen manga magazine Morning and has been followed by four sequels since.

The manga is about the unforgiving money-and-statistics-centric world of professional baseball, in a similar concept to Moneyball, but through the eyes of players: A relief pitcher and left-handed specialist, Bonda Natsunosuke, and Tokunaga, a retired pitcher turned color commentator. The fictional teams in the series are based on real teams in the NPB, particularly the Central League.

A twenty-four episodes anime television series adaptation by Studio Deen was broadcast from April to December 2018.

Characters 

A 26-year-old professional baseball player for the Jingū Spiders. Born in Yamanashi, he was recruited 8 years ago and was Mr. Irrelevant in his draft class that received only 15 million yen (US$137,000) as a signing bonus. Left-handed short middle relief pitcher and left-handed specialist. He earns 18 million yen (US$160,000) per year, which is above average for his role due to games played per season, yet it is well below average for players his age. Obsessively reads player's directories and has become very knowledgeable about other players contracts and annual salaries. He is very worried he won't be able to earn enough money during his baseball career so he can retire comfortably. It got to the point that in a radio interview, where he was inebriated, he blurted out his jealousy over the Osaka Tempters and Mops middle relief pitchers, who not only earn more than him, but also made twice the appearance each, exposing his inferiority complex.

Usually called ; he is a 35 years old radio color commentator. Originally from Yamanashi like Bonda. He was a starter for the Spiders for 10 years before retiring from baseball 3 years previously. He had less than 50 wins and his highest salary was 30 million yen per year (US$274,000). He got his current job through his connections with director of Otowa radio but often offers nothing of substance as a commentator. Bonda believes that due to his extravagant life style he ended his career broke and is making little money in his current job. Despite being more diligent on his research due to him using a computer, as opposed to Hideo Matsumoto's fully manual system, which helped the radio station getting inside scoop on newly promoted players, he was fired in season 2, just as he and his fiancée are travelling to Guam.

Spider's no.2 starting pitcher. 26, from the same draft class and area as Bonda, but earns 36 million yen, has 21 wins in 7 years as a pro. Bonda's best friend and they frequently go out for drinks together. In the current season of baseball he has been a starter in 3 games, with only 1.00 ERA, but lost all 1-0.

Left-handed Left outfielder for the Spiders, from Yamanashi like Bonda. He wears jersey no.3, traditionally given to the team's best hitter. He is dealing with a batting slump. He was first to hit Bonda's pitch for a home-run in a high school tournament. Earns 20 million per year.
    

Manager of Jingu Spiders. Has a lot of trust in Bonda as a reliever.
 

The Spiders bullpen coach. A stoic bearded man who has a good understanding of Bonda's strengths and weaknesses.

Japanese canteen waitress, very optimistic and bubbly and popular among men. From Osaka, a huge fan of Osaka Tempters, while she hated Bonda in the game, she had no recollection of him as a player when he was a customer. Her opinion of him changed when she attended a fan meeting session in the playoffs.

Bonda's scout. He advised Bonda to not spend the money he got as a signing bonus but use it as an insurance if he's injured or is dropped from the team.
Hideo Matsumoto
Voiced by himself. The only factual character in the anime, a baseball announcer for Otowa Radio Station. In season 2, it is revealed that he still uses a fully manual system to write notes rather than using a computer. However, due to the extensive research needed to cover back-to-back games live, he often works long hours and little sleep.
 

Right handed closer for the Spiders 29 years old. He was scouted from an amateur team and earned the closer spot last year receiving a 50 million yen contract. He robbed a win from Shibuya, but injured himself after blowing a save a month later. After he recovered, he blew one more save costing Shibuya another win and was sent to the minors.

A portly family man. He is a player in the Spiders' Minor League team who bats left but throws right. He is the same age as Bonda and was recruited out of college 4 years previously. He's been brought up to the majors after a successful streak in the minors but Bonda thinks he isn't cut out to be in the pros. Yet, he was instrumental in helping Spider win the divisional pennant after two hot streaks, all despite his wife giving birth to a son by emergency cesarean due to breech birth.

Media

Manga
Gurazeni is written by Yūji Moritaka and illustrated by Keiji Adachi. It was serialized in Kodansha's Morning magazine from December 9, 2010, to August 28, 2014. Kodansha collected its chapters in seventeen tankōbon volumes, released from May 23, 2011, to January 23, 2015.

A second series, titled , was serialized in Morning from September 25, 2014, to February 15, 2018. Kodansha collected its chapters in fifteen tankōbon volumes, released from January 23, 2015, to May 23, 2018.

A third series, titled , was serialized in Morning from March 29, 2018, to August 19, 2021. Kodansha collected its chapters in thirteen tankōbon volumes, released from June 22, 2018, to October 21, 2021.

A fourth series, titled , started in Morning on December 9, 2021. The series finished its first part on February 17, 2022; the second part started on May 19 of the same year.

Spin-offs
A spin-off manga, titled  , written by Yūji Moritaka and illustrated by Yōsuke Uzumaki, was serialized in Kodansha's Evening from March 10, 2020, to November 8, 2022. Kodansha collected its chapters in six tankōbon volumes, released from July 20, 2020, to February 21, 2023.

Another spin-off, titled , was serialized in Morning from October 7 to December 2, 2021. A second part was serialized in the same magazine from March 3 to April 28, 2022. A third part was serialized from August 4 to October 13, 2022. A fourth part started on February 2, 2023.

Anime
An anime television series aired from April 6 to June 22, 2018 on SKY PerfecTV!'s SkyPer! channel. Produced by SKY Perfect JSAT, Kodansha and Studio Deen, the series is directed by Ayumu Watanabe, with Hideo Takayashiki handling series composition and writing the scripts, Kenichi Ohnuki designing the characters and Akifumi Tada composing the music. The anime's theme song is Merigo feat. SKY-HI by Cypress Ueno to Robert Yoshino. The closing song is Shadow Monster performed by Asako Toki. Well known actor and film director 'Beat' Takeshi appeared as a guest star in the final episode of the first season.  
A second season aired from October 5 to December 21, 2018, which included baseball player Masahiro Yamamoto and comedian Yuki Iwai in cameo roles.

Episode list
{|class="wikitable" width="98%"
|-
! No. !! Title!! Directed by !! Original airdate
|-
|colspan="4" bgcolor="#CCF"|
|-

{{Episode list
|EpisodeNumber       = 19
|Title               = Designated for Assignment
|TranslitTitle       = Senryokugai Tsūkoku
|NativeTitle         = 戦力外通告
|NativeTitleLangCode = ja 
|DirectedBy          = Hidehiko Kadota
|OriginalAirDate     = 
|ShortSummary        = Both Nishigo'uchi, a 38 year old starter for the Sapporo Purple Shadows and the Spiders''' Tōkō —previously seen in episode 7— have been "DFA'd" by their teams. Neither of them want to quit playing, Tōkō because he believes he still has the ability to play well and Nishigo'uchi for financial reasons (paying hefty taxes from last year's inflated salary). Both of them enter tryouts on the slim chance that some other teams will pick them up. Eventually no Japanese teams are interested but both of them get signed by a team in Taiwan.
}}

{{Episode list
|EpisodeNumber       = 24
|Title               = Contract Renewals, Part Two
|TranslitTitle       = Keiyaku kōkai kōhen
|NativeTitle         = 契約更改・後編
|NativeTitleLangCode = ja 
|DirectedBy          = Shunji Yoshida
|OriginalAirDate     = 
|ShortSummary        = Bonda argues his case to gain a small, but significant extra million Yen to his contract, but the managers refuse to budge. Bonda brings up a game against The Mops at Jingu Stadium where his performance secured The Spiders' 4000th win and Kawasaki's 150th win but the managers counter that this has already been taken into account in their offer. Bonda then mentions that at this very game a famous singer and an actor were in the audience leading to the exposure of their relationship. This created a lot of media attention and the fact that the "star-couple" were Jingu Spiders-fans was frequently mentioned. At last, the management gives up and lets Bonda have a 26 million Yen annual contract. Afterwards Bonda is at first exultant but later starts to anguish over his behavior and worrying he might have pushed his luck too far.
}}
|}

Reception
It was number two on the 2012 Kono Manga ga Sugoi! Top 20 Manga for Male Readers survey. It was also nominated for the 5th Manga Taishō and it won the 37th Kodansha Manga Award for Best General Manga. Mike Toole of Anime News Network praised the anime, in particular the main character Bonda'' but acknowledged it was difficult to sell to most western viewers.

Notes

References

External links

Baseball in anime and manga
Kodansha manga
Seinen manga
Studio Deen
Winner of Kodansha Manga Award (General)